La Scuola d'Italia Guglielmo Marconi is an Italian international school in Manhattan, New York City, serving Pre-Kindergarten through high school/liceo. The Italian Ministry of Foreign Affairs established the school in 1977. The Italian government accredits the school, and the New York State Association of Independent Schools accredited the school in 2006.  It is the sole bilingual English-Italian day school in North America; The Italian government finances some of the school's expenses. As of 2015 the school has about 300 students.  The school holds an annual benefit dinner.

Campuses

 its primary students attend school at 12 East 96th Street, while secondary students attend school at 406 East 67th Street. Its secondary campus is in Carnegie Hill, former occupying a former residence at 12 East 96th Street. Robert L. Livingston built the house, while architect Ogden Codman, Jr. designed it.  The building on 12 East 96th Street is, as of 2015, on sale for $30 million.

In 2015 the Marconi school purchased a 14-story,  building, a former medical research facility of Mount Sinai Medical Systems at 432 W. 58th St. in West Midtown, for $55 million. The school was scheduled to renovate it and make it the new school building. It was originally scheduled to open in 2016.

See also
 Italian Americans in New York City
 American international schools in Italy:
 American Overseas School of Rome
 American School of Milan
 Aviano American High School
 Naples American High School

References

Further reading
An interview with the school chairperson Steve Acunto:
 "Steve Acunto: Chairman of the Scuola d'Italia Guglielmo Marconi in New York, NY." In: Mucci, Umberto. We The Italians: Two Flags One Heart.  . Start p. 5.

External links
 La Scuola d'Italia Guglielmo Marconi
  "Piccoli italiani crescono con la Scuola d'Italia Guglielmo Marconi" (Archive). La Voce di New York. March 22, 2014.

New York City
International schools in New York City
Private K-12 schools in Manhattan
Bilingual schools in the United States
Italian-American culture in New York City